A jet airliner or jetliner is an airliner powered by jet engines (passenger jet aircraft). Airliners usually have two or four jet engines; three-engined designs were popular in the 1970s but are less common today. Airliners are commonly classified as either the large wide-body aircraft, medium narrow-body aircraft and smaller regional jet.

Most airliners today are powered by jet engines, because they are capable of safely operating at high speeds and generate sufficient thrust to power large-capacity aircraft. The first jetliners, introduced in the 1950s, used the simpler turbojet engine; these were quickly supplanted by designs using turbofans, which are quieter and more fuel-efficient.

History

Early history
The first airliners with turbojet propulsion were experimental conversions of the Avro Lancastrian piston-engined airliner, which were flown with several types of early jet engine, including the de Havilland Ghost and the Rolls-Royce Nene. They retained the two inboard piston engines, the jets being housed in the outboard nacelles. The first airliner with jet power only was the Nene-powered Vickers VC.1 Viking G-AJPH, which first flew on 6 April 1948.

The early jet airliners had much lower interior levels of noise and vibration than contemporary piston-engined aircraft, so much so that in 1947, after piloting a jet powered aircraft for the first time, Wing Commander Maurice A. Smith, editor of Flight magazine, said, "Piloting a jet aircraft has confirmed one opinion I had formed after flying as a passenger in the Lancastrian jet test beds, that few, if any, having flown in a jet-propelled transport, will wish to revert to the noise, vibration and attendant fatigue of an airscrew-propelled piston-engined aircraft"

1950s

The first purpose-built jet airliner was the British de Havilland Comet which first flew in 1949 and entered service in 1952, though it was withdrawn from service due to serious structural problems. Also developed in 1949 was the Avro Canada C102 Jetliner, which never reached production; however the term jetliner came into use as a generic term for passenger jet aircraft.

These first jet airliners were followed some years later by the Sud Aviation Caravelle from France, the Tupolev Tu-104 from the Soviet Union (2nd in service), and the Boeing 707, Douglas DC-8 and Convair 880 from the United States. National prestige was attached to developing prototypes and bringing these early designs into service. There was also a strong nationalism in purchasing policy, so that US Boeing and Douglas aircraft became closely associated with Pan Am, while BOAC ordered British Comets.

Pan Am and BOAC, with the help of advertising agencies and their strong nautical traditions of command hierarchy and chain of command (retained from their days of operating flying boats), were quick to link the "speed of jets" with the safety and security of the "luxury of ocean liners" in the public's perception.

Aeroflot used Soviet Tupolevs, while Air France introduced French Caravelles. Commercial realities dictated exceptions, however, as few airlines could risk missing out on a superior product: American Airlines ordered the pioneering Comet (but later cancelled when the Comet ran into metal fatigue problems), Canadian, British and European airlines could not ignore the better operating economics of the Boeing 707 and the DC-8, while some American airlines ordered the Caravelle.

Boeing became the most successful of the early manufacturers. The KC-135 Stratotanker and military versions of the 707 remain operational, mostly as tankers or freighters. The basic configuration of the Boeing, Convair and Douglas aircraft jet airliner designs, with widely spaced podded engines underslung on pylons beneath a swept wing, proved to be the most common arrangement and was most easily compatible with the large-diameter high-bypass turbofan engines that subsequently prevailed for reasons of quietness and fuel efficiency.

Innovations
The Pratt & Whitney JT3 turbojets powered the original Boeing 707 and DC-8 models; in the early 1960s the JT3 was modified into the JT3D low-bypass turbofan for long-range 707 and DC-8 variants.

The de Havilland and Tupolev designs had engines incorporated within the wings next to the fuselage, a concept that endured only within military designs while the Caravelle pioneered engines mounted either side of the rear fuselage.

1960s
The 1960s jet airliners include the BAC One-Eleven and Douglas DC-9 twinjets; Boeing 727, Hawker Siddeley Trident and Tupolev Tu-154 trijets; and the paired multi-engined Ilyushin Il-62, and Vickers VC10.

Innovations

The 1960s jet airliners were known for the advancement of turbofan technology, as well as the advent of the trijet design. Jet airliners that entered service in the 1960s were powered by slim, low-bypass turbofan engines, many aircraft used the rear-engined, T-tail configuration, such as the BAC One-Eleven, Douglas DC-9 twinjets; Boeing 727, Hawker Siddeley Trident, Tupolev Tu-154 trijets; and the paired multi-engined Ilyushin Il-62, and Vickers VC10. The rear-engined T-tail arrangement is still used for jetliners with a maximum takeoff weight of less than 50 tons.

Other 1960s developments, such as rocket assisted takeoff (RATO), water-injection, and afterburners (also known as reheat) used on supersonic jetliners (SSTs) such as Concorde and the Tupolev Tu-144, have been superseded.

1970s

The 1970s jet airliners introduced wide-body (twin-aisle) craft and high-bypass turbofan engines. Pan Am and Boeing "again opened a new era in commercial aviation" when the first Boeing 747 entered service in January 1970, marking the debut of the high-bypass turbofan which lowered operating costs, and the initial models which could seat up to 400 passengers which earned it the nickname "Jumbo Jet". Other wide-body designs included the McDonnell Douglas DC-10 and Lockheed L-1011 TriStar trijets, smaller than the Boeing 747 but capable of flying similar long-range routes from airports with shorter runways. There was also the market debut of the European consortium Airbus, whose first aircraft was the twinjet Airbus A300.

1980s

In 1978, Boeing unveiled the twin-engine Boeing 757 to replace its 727, and the twin-engine 767 to challenge the Airbus A300. The mid-size 757 and 767 launched to market success, due in part to 1980s extended-range twin-engine operational performance standards (ETOPS) regulations governing transoceanic twinjet operations. These regulations allowed twin-engine airliners to make ocean crossings at up to three hours' distance from emergency diversionary airports. Under ETOPS rules, airlines began operating the 767 on long-distance overseas routes that did not require the capacity of larger airliners.

1990s
By the late 1980s, DC-10 and L-1011 models were approaching retirement age, prompting manufacturers to develop replacement designs. McDonnell Douglas started working on the MD-11, a stretched and upgraded successor of the DC-10. Airbus, thanks to the success of its A320 family, developed the medium-range A330 twinjet and the related long-range A340 quad-jet. In 1988, Boeing began developing what would be the 777 twinjet, using the twin-engine configuration given past design successes, projected engine developments, and reduced-cost benefits. In addition, Boeing also released a major update on their 747, the 747-400.

Present day

The most modern airliners are characterized by increased use of composite materials, high-bypass ratio turbofan engines, and more advanced digital flight systems. Examples of the latest widebody airliners are the Airbus A380 (first flight in 2005), Boeing 787 (first flight in 2009) and Airbus A350 (first flight in 2013). These improvements allowed longer ranges and lower cost of transportation per passenger. Sukhoi Superjet 100 and Airbus A220 (formerly Bombardier CSeries) are examples of narrowbodies with similar level of technological advancements.

Timeline

Comparison

See also
 Airliner
 Aviation
 Business jet
 Freight aircraft
 Jet aircraft
 Wide-body aircraft
 List of jet airliners

References

Jet airliners
Vehicles introduced in 1948